Capilla de la Magdalena (Llanes) is a church in Llanes, Asturias, Spain. The church was established in the 18th century.

See also
Asturian art
Catholic Church in Spain
Churches in Asturias
List of oldest church buildings

References

Churches in Llanes
18th-century establishments in Spain
Christian organizations established in the 18th century
Roman Catholic chapels in Spain